Maze is a 2000 romance film about a New York painter and sculptor—Lyle Maze (Rob Morrow)—with Tourette syndrome (TS) and obsessive–compulsive disorder (OCD), who falls in love with Callie (Laura Linney), the pregnant girlfriend of Maze's best friend Mike (Craig Sheffer) while Mike is away on a long stay in Africa as a doctor.

Development
After viewing a documentary on Tourette's, Morrow believed that individuals with TS 
"had a lament that they would never experience love because of this affliction".

Of the film's theme, Morrow said:
I wasn't looking to do anything about Tourette—I was really thinking about themes of love. It was becoming clear that love is one of the most important things we can experience. I was trying to come up with a character who adapted himself to a life without love. ... My movie is a tribute to anyone with an affliction who thinks they'll never find love.

Casting 
Morrow had played a person with TS in the film Other Voices and had already learned to portray tics, so "casting himself actually made things a bit easier". Linney was Morrow's first choice for the role of Callie because "he felt the kind of understanding and close rapport he knew would be necessary to bring the two lead characters to life".

Filming
Laura Linney had to deal with a different kind of physicality in the film, appearing completely nude in a lengthy scene in which her character Callie poses for Lyle in his art studio-not exactly a love scene, but with subtle sensual overtones. "It's always difficult, at least for me," she said. "It's just not a natural thing to do! I'm very glad that it was Rob behind the camera," she said, acknowledging that actors-turned-directors are "always helpful-if they're good. They're going to understand acting in a much freer way."

Critical reception 
Rotten Tomatoes gave the film an average rating of 4.9/10 based on 22 reviews. 
The New York Times wrote:

References

External links
 

2000 films
Films about Tourette syndrome
2000s romance films
Films about obsessive–compulsive disorder
2000s English-language films
American romance films
2000s American films